Slow Hole to China: Rare and Unreleased is an album by American rock band Clutch, consisting of various previously unreleased recordings, released in 2003. Clutch has since released a remastered reissue of the album on April 28, 2009, re-titled Slow Hole to China: Rare and Re-released.

Album information 
The album was released on CD by River Road Records, and 3,000 copies were printed on 12" LP by Emetic Records, with 2,000 of these regular black vinyl, while 1,000 were rare red marble vinyl.

It is an album of rare recording of songs (that have been extensively bootlegged over the years), with cover versions and some of the rare singles by the band. It also has some 'alternate' earlier versions of songs that were released on albums in a different format to what was originally recorded, something the band have done with albums such as Jam Room before. The remastered reissue has three more of such tracks added to the original.

Track listing 
All tracks written by Clutch, except where noted.

Personnel 
 Neil Fallon – vocals
 Tim Sult – guitar
 Dan Maines – bass
 Jean-Paul Gaster – drums

References

External links 
 

Clutch (band) compilation albums
B-side compilation albums
2003 compilation albums